17th Parallel: Vietnam in War is a 1968 French documentary film directed by Marceline Loridan-Ivens and Joris Ivens. The film sets out to show the effects of the American bombing campaign on the Vietnamese people, who were mainly peasant farmers.

Synopsis
In 1968, between South Vietnam under the control of the US Army and North Vietnam struggling for independence, a demilitarized zone was created around the 17th parallel. Joris Ivens and his wife, Marceline Loridan, went to this area around the village of Vinh Linh for two months to live among the peasants who had taken refuge in cellars in an attempt to survive the incessant bombing of the American artillery.

References

External links

1968 films
1968 documentary films
1960s French-language films
French documentary films
French war films
French black-and-white films
Films directed by Joris Ivens
Documentary films about the Vietnam War
1960s French films